Mian Marghoob Ahmad is a Pakistani politician  who had been a Member of the Provincial Assembly of the Punjab, from June 2013 to May 2018 and from August 2018 to January 2023. He had been a member of the National Assembly of Pakistan from 2008 to 2013.

Early life and education
He was born on 1 January 1959 in Lahore.

He has completed graduation.

Political career
He was elected to the National Assembly of Pakistan from Constituency NA-121 (Lahore-IV) as a candidate of Pakistan Muslim League (N) (PML-N) in 2008 Pakistani general election. He received 72,227 votes and defeated Aurangzeb Shaafi Burki, a candidate of Pakistan Peoples Party (PPP). In the same election, he ran for the seat of the Provincial Assembly of the Punjab as an independent candidate from Constituency PP-151 (Lahore-XV) but was unsuccessful. He received 7 votes and lost the seat to Ijaz Ahmed Khan, a candidate of PML-N.

He ran for the seat of the National Assembly as an independent candidate from Constituency NA-121 (Lahore-IV) in 2013 Pakistani general election but was unsuccessful. He received 555 votes and lost the seat to Mehr Ishtiaq Ahmed.

He was elected to the Provincial Assembly of the Punjab from Constituency PP-150 (Lahore-XIV) Lahore as a candidate of PML-N in by-polls held in August 2013. He received 18,870 votes and defeated  Mehr Wajid Azim, a candidate of Pakistan Tehreek-e-Insaf (PTI).

He was re-elected to Provincial Assembly of the Punjab as a candidate of PML-N from Constituency PP-149 (Lahore-VI) in 2018 Pakistani general election.

References

Living people
Pakistani MNAs 2008–2013
Punjab MPAs 2013–2018
1959 births
Pakistan Muslim League (N) MPAs (Punjab)
Punjab MPAs 2018–2023